The Co-operative Building on Abbey Road in Barrow-in-Furness, Cumbria, England is a former department store. Constructed by the Barrow Co-operative Society in 1889 and expanded in 1902 it served as the town's largest such shop up until closure in 1996. Pub operator Wetherspoon opened a venue in the ground floor of the former Co-op Building in 1998 named after the Furness Railway and in 2015 converted the vacant upper floors of the building into a 52-bedroom hotel.

See also
 British co-operative movement

External links
 The Furness Railway Pub, Wetherspoon
 The Furness Railway Hotel, Wetherspoon

References

Co-operative Building
Co-operative Building, Barrow
Co-operative Building, Barrow
Co-operative Building, Barrow
Co-operative Building, Barrow